Carmen Ruiz Moragas (1898 – May 20, 1936) was a Spanish actress. For years, she was the mistress of King Alfonso XIII, with whom she had two children.

Early life 

Ruiz was born in Madrid, Spain.  Her parents lived in Madrid but they were from Málaga.

In her long career in the Spanish theater industry she had the honor to participate in famous works made by directors well known and even in some European co-productions. She belonged to people dedicated to theater, but at the same time to the bourgeois class of Madrid. In 1920s and 1930s, she was a lover of King Alfonso XIII. She had two children: Leandro and María Teresa. She died of cancer in 1936.

Career 

She started her career as actress at age 20, when she finished working for María Guerrero company. She was a pioneer of silent films. She became a famous Spanish actress before the Spanish Civil War.

She acted throughout Spain but achieved great success representing dramas as Mother Joy, Malvaloca, In the 1920s, she became a famous dramatic actress. In the 1930s, Ruiz established a theater company and achieved success in theaters throughout Spain, including Madrid, Lara, Princess Beatriz, Princess Isabel, Pavón and Cervantes.

During the first half of the twentieth century, she worked mainly in the theater with Spanish actors such as Fernando Díaz de Mendoza, Enrique Rambal, Pepita Meliá and Carola Fernán Gómez.

Personal life 

She belonged to people dedicated to theater, but at the same time to the bourgeois class of Madrid. She married Mexican matador Rodolfo Gaona in Granada in 1917; the marriage did not last long. In the 1920s and the 1930s, she was mistress of King Alfonso XIII. She had two children: Leandro and María Teresa. She became ill and died in 1936. Although their economic situation was not bad, their children received indirect help from their father. This was the test for Spanish law to award them their father's last name, calling the two children thereafter de Borbón, although his sister had an honorary title since he had already died.

References

Bibliography 

 The real life and history of the theater (2005) Juan José Videgain  . 
 Catálogo del cine español películas 1931–1936 author: Angel Luis Hueso Ed.Catédra Filmoteca española. (2003).
 Un siglo de cine español (1998), author: Luis Gasca enciclopedias Planeta .
 Diccionario Akal de teatro (1997) author: Manuel Gómez García.
 Historia del teatro María Guerrero (1998).
 The scene M.Fca.Vilches Madrid between 1926–1931 and Dru Dougherty (1998) Ed.Fundamentos. His career as an actor, director and entrepreneur during those years.
 Leandro de Borbón, mis padres, mi historia, (2007) Esfera de los libros.
 Newspapers of the time since the 1915s across Spain: La Vanguardia, ABC, El Heraldo de Madrid, El Sol, El Liberal, El Correo Vasco, La Voz, Ya, Blanco y Negro ...

1936 deaths
1898 births
Mistresses of Spanish royalty
Actresses from Madrid
Spanish film actresses
20th-century Spanish actresses